Daniel Kajzer (born 23 February 1992) is a Polish professional footballer who plays as a goalkeeper for Arka Gdynia.

Career

ROW Rybnik
Kajzer began his career with ROW Rybnik, making his senior debut in 2012. In 2012–13, his first season, he helped ROW Rybnik achieve promotion to the I liga. Kajzer made 103 total league appearances for five seasons with the club, keeping 28 clean sheets.

Botev Plovdiv
On 12 June 2017, after a successful trial period, Kajzer signed a two-year contract with Bulgarian club Botev Plovdiv.

On 6 April Kajzer was included in the starting line-up and kept a clean sheet during the 1-0 win over Levski Sofia.

On 29 April Kajzer saved a penalty in the last minutes for the 2-1 home win over CSKA Sofia. His performance in the game was selected for save of the week.

Arka Gdynia
After spending the 2019–20 season as a back-up with Śląsk Wrocław, making only one cup appearance, on 28 July 2020 he joined Arka Gdynia.

Career statistics

Club

Honours

Club
Botev Plovdiv
 Bulgarian Supercup: 2017
 Bulgarian Cup: Runners-up 2019

References

External links
 

1992 births
People from Tarnowskie Góry
Sportspeople from Silesian Voivodeship
Living people
Polish footballers
Association football goalkeepers
Botev Plovdiv players
Śląsk Wrocław players
Arka Gdynia players
I liga players
II liga players
First Professional Football League (Bulgaria) players
Polish expatriate footballers
Expatriate footballers in Bulgaria